Nerele (In Bashkir pronounces) or Nurali (In Russian pronounces) is mountain ridge in the Southern Urals in Russia.

Physical geography 
It is located in the Uchalisky District of Bashkortostan, a few kilometers northwest of Starobayramgulovo. The maximum height of the ridge is 752 meters. The peaks of Nerele are round and treeless, despite their low height. The Miass River, its tributary Sherambay and its tributary Uya Shardatma originate on the slopes of the ridge. The ridge is a popular destination for jeeps, ATVs, motorcycles and bicycles.

The Ridge is 8 km long and 2 km wide. It is connected by a bridge (628 m) with the Siritur ridge. Covered with meadow vegetation, in ravines, gorges and quads - a dense forest.

The ridge is composed of Silurian deposits: tuffs, siliceous and clayey rocks, limestones (440-410 million years BC), as well as hyperbasites.

Landscapes - pine and birch forests on dark gray forest mountain soils and meadow steppes on leached chernozems.

Name 
The name of the ridge comes from the Bashkir "Nurly" - light, as it is composed of light rocks and treeless. According to another version, the name Nurali is an anthroponym, comes from the name of a person whose name was Nur Ali, that is, light Ali.

Flora 
The tree species of the ridge: pine, larch, spruce, fir, birch, aspen, gray alder. Shrubs: bird cherry, viburnum, mountain ash, hawthorn, wild rose, currant, cherry, broom, willow, hazel, euonymus. For the most part, the ridge is bare, only in some places is covered with coniferous or mixed forest.

References

Sources 

 Нуралинский гипербазитовый комплекс
 clubs.ya.ru
 uraltur
 Хребет Нурали | Путеводитель по Челябинску и Челябинской области

Mountain ranges
Ural Mountains
Mountains of Bashkortostan